Lindenau is a municipality in the Oberspreewald-Lausitz district, in Upper Lusatia, Brandenburg, Germany. Since 1992, it is part of the Amt (municipal confederation) of Ortrand.

Lindenau, located between the rivers Pulsnitz and Schwarze Elster, is the westernmost village of the historic Upper Lusatia region. The Reihendorf arose about 1200 during the reign of King Ottokar I of Bohemia in the course of the German Ostsiedlung in the former Milceni lands, when a motte-and-bailey castle was erected on the border with the Margraviate of Meissen, vis-à-vis the fortress of Großkmehlen. The settlement of Lindenaw was first mentioned in 1342 deed.

Held by the Electorate of Saxony since the 1635 Peace of Prague, Lindenau with northeastern Upper Lusatia passed to the Kingdom of Prussia according to the Final Act of the 1815 Vienna Congress. It was administrated within the Silesia Province (Lower Silesia Province from 1919), again the westernmost village of the province. From 1952 until 1990, it was part of the Bezirk Cottbus of East Germany.

Demography

References

Populated places in Oberspreewald-Lausitz